Disney Junior is a Dutch pay television block on Disney Channel and a television station for young children, owned by The Walt Disney Company. It shares its video feed with Disney Junior Scandinavia and featured an additional Dutch audio track for its viewers in the Netherlands and Flanders. It closed down in the Netherlands, but continues broadcasting in Flanders. Viewers in Wallonia, Brussels and Luxembourg receive the French version, which has the same schedule.

History 
On 3 May 2010 Disney Junior was first launched as Playhouse Disney in the Netherlands and on 22 June in Belgium. It also launched under the same name as a block on the main Disney Channel. Disney Junior replaced Playhouse Disney on 10 September 2011 and was launched in Proximus TV and Ziggo.

In 2018, one third of Disney Belgium's employees were laid off, as Disney decided to move its Benelux subsidiary to France, including among others Disney Channel activities.

Ziggo announced that Disney Junior as a TV channel would close down in the Netherlands on 1 April 2019. Disney Channels Benelux is planning to distribute its programs differently (on Disney+). The Dutch channel continues broadcasting in Belgium.

After a year absence, the channel's programs moved to "Mickey Mornings" on Disney Channel on 17 November 2020.

Disney Junior on Disney Channel 
Besides the TV channel there is also a Disney Junior program block on Disney Channel from 8:30 AM to 11:30 AM.

See also

 Disney Junior
 Disney Channel (Dutch TV channel)
 Disney Channel (Belgium)

References
 

Defunct television channels in the Netherlands
Defunct television channels in Belgium
2011 establishments in the Netherlands
2011 establishments in Belgium
2019 disestablishments in the Netherlands
Television channels and stations established in 2010
Netherlands and Flanders